Atoposauridae is a family of crocodile-line archosaurs belonging to Neosuchia. The majority of the family are known from Late Jurassic to Early Cretaceous marine deposits in France, Portugal, and Bavaria in southern Germany. The discovery of the genus Aprosuchus, however, extends the duration of the lineage to the end of the Cretaceous in Romania.

Classification

Phylogeny
Cladogram modified from Buscalioni and Sanz (1988) and Buscalioni and Sanz (1990):

References

Late Jurassic crocodylomorphs
Taxa named by Paul Gervais
Prehistoric reptile families